Carl Caldenius (1887–1961), until 1920 known by the surname Carlzon, was a Swedish Quaterany geologist and geotechnical engineer. He is mostly known for his geochronological work in Patagonia.

Caldenius worked as geotechnical engineer for the Swedish State Railways until 1922 when he started to work full-time with his Ph.D thesis "Ragundasjöns stratigrafi och geokronologi" (Stratigraphy and geochronology of Lake Ragunda) that he defended in 1924. In 1925 he travelled to Argentina as part of a Swedish-Argentine collaboration to extend the clay varve chronology of Gerard De Geer to the Southern Hemisphere. After returning to Swedsen in 1930 he joined an expedition to Australia and New Zealand where he applied knowledge of varves to study the Carboniferous Karoo Ice Age.

See also
Carl Skottsberg
José María Sobral

References

1887 births
1961 deaths
Quaternary geologists
20th-century Swedish geologists
Geotechnical engineers
Academic staff of Stockholm University